Jelena Zrnić (born December 22, 1975) is a former Croatian female professional basketball player.

External links
Profile

1975 births
Living people
Sportspeople from Bjelovar
Croatian women's basketball players
Centers (basketball)